Valentin Zeglovsky (1908–1985) was a ballet dancer with the Ballets Russes who was one of the de Basil dancers who is considered to have contributed to Australian ballet.

Zeglovsky was born in Kkhartov, Russian Empire. After the Russian Revolution his family moved to the Riga in Latvia. Initially interested in boxing he took up ballet in an attempt to improve his footwork. He then trained at the Riga Opera House under Madame Feodorova, wife of Michel Fokine. In the 1930s he joined the de Basil company in the United States of America and later in 1938 came to Australia with the troupe.

At the end of the second Ballets Russes tour of Australia Zeglovsky settled in that country in April 1939. In the same year he established a school in Sydney, and performed with an Australian company in June 1939, where he danced with Tamara Tchinarova and Kira Abricossova at a benefit performance organised by Edouard Borovansky, at the Princess Theatre in Melbourne.

In January 1942 he joined the Kirsova company during its Melbourne season which began at His Majesty's Theatre. Zeglovsky returned to Europe in 1949, or soon after, and started Zeglovsky's ballet school in London, where Zbyshek Lisak trained under him.

See also
 List of Russian ballet dancers

References

 Valentin Zeglovsky, Ballet Crusade, Reed & Harris, 1944.
 Dictionary Catalog of the Dance Collection: A List of Authors, Titles, and Subjects of Multi-media Materials in the Dance Collection of the Performing Arts Research Center of the New York Public Library, New York Public Library. Astor, Lenox, and Tilden Foundations, 1974.
 Edward H. Pask, Ballet in Australia: the second act, 1940–1980, Oxford University Press, 1982.
 Katharine Brisbane, Entertaining Australia: An Illustrated History, Currency Press Pty Ltd., 1991.
 Roland E. Robinson, The Drift of Things: An Autobiography, 1914–52, Macmillan, 1973.
 Tamara Finch, Dancing into the Unknown: My Life in the Ballets Russes and Beyond, Dance Books, 2007.

External links
 "Valentin Zeglovsky: some Australian notes" by Michelle Potter
 "Valentin Zeglovsky: further Australian notes" by Michelle Potter
 Zeglovsky school of Russian ballet
 Portrait of Valentin Zeglovsky, circa 1030-1940
 
 
 1939 news article on Zeglovsky

Ballets Russes dancers
Dancers from Kharkiv
Latvian emigrants to Australia
Russian male ballet dancers
Australian male ballet dancers
1908 births
1985 deaths
Australian people of Russian descent